Kindi may refer to:

Al-Kindi (surname)
Kindi Department, department of Boulkiemdé, Burkina Faso
Kindi, Kindi, its capital
Kindi, Andemtenga, a town in Andemtenga Department, Burkina Faso
Kindi (Tanzanian ward), Moshi Rural district, Kilimanjaro Region, Tanzania
Kindi (vessel), a bell metal vessel usually found in traditional Kerala homes

See also
 Kindai (disambiguation)
Kunud